This is a list of chief ministers of the Australian Capital Territory by time in office. The basis of the list is the inclusive number of days between dates.

Rank by time in office
Parties

Total time in office of political parties in Australian Capital Territory
Australian Capital Territory Assembly –  days as of

Labor
{{#expr:
 + 1 + 
 + 1 + 
 + 1 + 
 + 1 + 
                                  
 }}

Liberal
{{#expr:
 + 1 +  
 + 1 + 

}} days.

Notes

See also
Chief Ministers of the Australian Capital Territory
List of Australian heads of government by time in office
List of prime ministers of Australia by time in office
List of premiers of New South Wales by time in office
List of premiers of Queensland by time in office
List of premiers of South Australia by time in office
List of premiers of Tasmania by time in office
List of premiers of Victoria by time in office
List of premiers of Western Australia by time in office
List of chief ministers of the Northern Territory by time in office

 
Australian Capital Territory